Benjamin Harvey Bailey Smith (born 21 September 1977), also known by the stage name Doc Brown, is an English actor, comedian, rapper, screenwriter, songwriter, and voiceover artist. He portrayed DS Joe Hawkins in the television series Law & Order: UK. He is also known for portraying Nathan Carter in the CBBC television series 4 O'Clock Club from 2012 to 2015.

He also voiced a number of episodes of the popular show Funny Animals: Unleashed. This show was aired via 4MUSIC.

Early life
Doc Brown was born Benjamin Harvey Bailey Smith, son of a Jamaican immigrant, Yvonne Bailey, and an Englishman, Harvey Smith, who was 30 years his wife's senior. Raised in the Willesden area of north-west London, Smith is the younger brother of novelist and essayist Zadie Smith. Smith attended Hampstead School. Explaining his stage name, he has said: "Doc Brown's been my nickname since school, after the scientist in Back to the Future, because I was gangly and geeky. When I started doing rap battles in my teens, it became my hip-hop handle and it's stuck."

Music
Doc Brown began performing as a battle rapper in 2000, appearing at the Dingwalls nightclub in Camden Lock, and later at the "Jump Off" competition in Soho.

Film and television
Smith appeared in the BBC series Rev and Miranda, as well as Channel 4's The Inbetweeners, and the CBBC series Big Babies. In 2013 Smith guest starred in the Channel 4 comedy-drama series Derek, in which he played a young man sentenced to community service in a nursing home.

He appeared in Ben Miller's film Huge, and co-starred in Other Side of the Game. He wrote music for the 2011 Joe Cornish film Attack the Block.

Smith created a teen comedy-drama for the BBC called 4 O'Clock Club. He starred in the show in series 1, and made guest appearances in series 2–4. Since series 5 his brother writes the raps. The show has currently run for 118 episodes.

Most recently, he has delved deeper into dramatic acting, starring in the Frank Spotnitz television show Hunted, a thriller for Cinemax. Smith then went on to shoot an episode of Midsomer Murders and in 2014, he played the role of DS Joe Hawkins in the final series of ITV's Law & Order: UK Also he had a viral song on the TV show Russell Howard's Good News called "My Propertea". Smith has also appeared in new Ann Summers series Brief Encounters.

In 2016, Doc guest starred on the BBC One television film Damilola, Our Loved Boy as a taxi driver. He also participated in the second series of the comedy game show Taskmaster.

In February 2017, he appeared on Dave's Crackanory reading "Devil's Haircut" by Sarah Morgan, then in October, Smith appeared as a guest on Episode 100 of The Gaffer Tapes: Fantasy Football Podcast. In late 2017, he performed the role of DS Evans in Sky One's Bounty Hunters.

His love of film means he has been a guest presenter several times on the BBC Radio 5 Live film review show hosted by Simon Mayo and Mark Kermode.

In 2018, Smith appeared in the Doctor Who episode "The Tsuranga Conundrum".

In 2020, he played Richie Hansen, an abusive husband, in the second series of BBC TV drama The Split.

In 2022 he played Lieutenant Supervisor Blevin in five episodes of the first series of the Star Wars TV series Andor.

Picture book
A children's picture book entitled I Am Bear, illustrated by Sav Akyüz, which has been described as "a rap-style read-aloud story", was published by Walker Books in February 2016.

Production
As of May 2014, Smith was the producer of The Football Ramble Live.

Personal life
Smith is a supporter of Crystal Palace F.C. He has two daughters.

Discography

Filmography

References

External links
 
 
 
 

1977 births
Living people
20th-century English comedians
20th-century English male actors
21st-century English comedians
21st-century English male actors
Alumni of the University of East Anglia
Black British male rappers
Black British male comedians
English comedy musicians
English people of Jamaican descent
People from Kilburn, London
Rappers from London